was a Japanese girl group consisted of select members from Hello! Project's futsal club Gatas Brilhantes H.P. and Hello Pro Egg.

History
The group was formed in 2007. The group's name combines the Japanese word ongaku (music) with the Portuguese word gatas, taken from the name of the Hello! Project futsal team, Gatas Brilhantes (that means Bright Female Cats). Together, the two words literally mean "musical cats" (gatas being the feminine form of the word gatos (cats)), although gatas is also slang for "pretty girls".

In early 2008, Erina Mano and Mika Mutō (both Hello! Pro Eggs) graduated from the group. Mano left the group but continued as solo singer within Hello! Project, whereas Mutō left both the group and Hello! Project in its entirety to return to life as a normal student and focus on her studies.

In August 2009, it was announced that Arisa Noto and Yuri Sawada, two more Eggs, would both be graduating from Hello! Project. Sawada graduated from both Hello! Project and Ongaku Gatas, to focus on university. Noto, however, remained in the group, even though she had graduated from Hello! Project.

Although, soon after their winter tour finished in early 2009, Hitomi Yoshizawa, Rika Ishikawa, Asami Konno and Mai Satoda, all officially graduated from Hello! Project in March 2009 the group remained together, though they switched management to Up-Front Agency (the "parent management" of Hello! Project itself). The group went on a hiatus after their graduation. However, they began to tour again in March 2010, playing a total of three venues (Osaka, Aichi prefecture and Tokyo) to promote their new single "Ready! Kick Off!!" released on March 3.

Members 
 Hitomi Yoshizawa (Leader)
 Rika Ishikawa
  (Hello! Pro Egg member)
  (Hello! Pro Egg member)

Graduated members 
 Erina Mano (graduated March 2, 2008)
  (graduated April 28, 2008)
  (graduated August 30, 2009)
 Asami Konno (graduated April 4, 2011)
 Arisa Noto
 Mai Satoda

Discography

Albums

Singles

DVD

References

External links 
 Ongaku Gatas discography at Up-Front Works Official Website
 Official Website (Japanese)

Musical groups established in 2007
Japanese girl groups
Japanese idol groups
Japanese pop music groups
Hello! Project groups
2007 establishments in Japan
Musical groups from Tokyo